The 2017–18 Colgate Raiders women's basketball team represents Colgate University during the 2017–18 NCAA Division I women's basketball season. The Raiders, led by second year head coach Bill Cleary, play their home games at Cotterell Court and were members of the Patriot League. They finished the season 7–23, 3–15 in Patriot League play to finish in last place. They lost in the first round of the Patriot League women's tournament to Holy Cross.

Previous season
They finished the season 10–20, 7–11 in Patriot League play to finish in a tie for eighth place. They lost in the quarterfinals of the Patriot League women's tournament to Army.

Roster

Schedule

|-
!colspan=9 style=| Non-conference regular season

|-
!colspan=9 style=| Patriot League regular season

|-
!colspan=9 style=| Patriot League Women's Tournament

See also
 2017–18 Colgate Raiders men's basketball team

References

Colgate
Colgate Raiders women's basketball seasons